This is a list of earthquakes in 1935. Only magnitude 6.0 or greater earthquakes appear on the list. Lower magnitude events are included if they have caused death, injury or damage. Events which occurred in remote areas will be excluded from the list as they wouldn't have generated significant media interest. All dates are listed according to UTC time. Among the bigger earthquakes of the year was the devastating Pakistan event in May which left 60,000 dead. Taiwan also fared badly with three magnitude 7.0+ events and in particular a quake in April left 3,276 dead. Other large quakes struck New Guinea, Dutch East Indies, British Solomon Islands and somewhat unusually Italian Libya. Turkey and Iran saw their share of the action as well with substantial deaths being caused by several quakes over the year.

Overall

By death toll 

 Note: At least 10 casualties

By magnitude 

 Note: At least 7.0 magnitude

Notable events

January

February

March

April

May

June

July

August

September

October

November

December

References

1935
 
1935